Giulia Bevilacqua (born 19 May 1979) is an Italian film, stage and television actress.

Life and career 
Born in Rome, the younger daughter of two architects, Bevilacqua studied at the Accademia Filarmonica as a chorister, and then attended at the Centro Sperimentale di Cinematografia.

Starting from 2002 she appeared in several TV series. Her breakout role was Anna Gori in three seasons of the Canale 5 crime series Distretto di Polizia.

Selected filmography 
 Distretto di Polizia (2005-2009, 2011, TV) 
 Cardiofitness (2007)
 The Trial Begins (2007)
 Fuoriclasse (2013-2014, TV)
 Tutta colpa di Freud (2014)
 È arrivata la felicità (2015, TV)
 Natale col Boss (2015)
 The King's Musketeers (2018)

References

External links
  
 

1979 births
Living people
Actresses from Rome
Italian film actresses
Italian stage actresses
Italian television actresses
Centro Sperimentale di Cinematografia alumni